Charles Clifton may refer to:
Charles Clifton, 11th Earl of Loudoun or Charles Rawdon-Hastings, 11th Earl of Loudoun (1855–1920)
Charles Clifton (cricketer) (1846–unknown), English cricketer
Charles E. Clifton (1904–1976), American microbiologist